The 2013 NBL season was the 32nd season of the National Basketball League. The 2013 season saw the withdrawal of the Auckland Pirates and Harbour Heat, but saw the return of the Waikato Pistons after a one-year hiatus as well as the Super City Rangers, who returned to the league for the first time since 1995.

The 2013 NBL Final Four saw the top four teams play off on Saturday 13 July in a semifinals round, with the winner of each game playing in the final on Sunday 14 July at Pettigrew Green Arena in Napier.

Team information

*Despite holding New Zealand citizenship, Jones had to play as an import due to a new league rule where each team could only field one naturalised New Zealand player (Manawatu already had Nick Horvath filling that spot).

Summary

Regular season standings

Final Four

Awards

Player of the Week

Statistics leaders
Stats as of the end of the regular season

Regular season
 Most Valuable Player: Lindsay Tait (Wellington Saints)
 NZ Most Valuable Player: Lindsay Tait (Wellington Saints)
 Most Outstanding Guard: Lindsay Tait (Wellington Saints)
 Most Outstanding NZ Guard: Lindsay Tait (Wellington Saints)
 Most Outstanding Forward: Brian Conklin (Southland Sharks)
 Most Outstanding NZ Forward/Centre: B. J. Anthony (Otago Nuggets)
 Scoring Champion: Josh Pace (Nelson Giants)
 Rebounding Champion: Zack Atkinson (Waikato Pistons)
 Assist Champion: Lindsay Tait (Wellington Saints)
 Rookie of the Year: Tai Webster (Waikato Pistons)
 Coach of the Year: Paul Henare (Southland Sharks)
 All-Star Five:
 G: Lindsay Tait (Wellington Saints)
 G: Josh Pace (Nelson Giants)
 F: B. J. Anthony (Otago Nuggets)
 F: Brian Conklin (Southland Sharks)
 C: Nick Horvath (Manawatu Jets)

Final Four
 Final Four MVP: Leon Henry (Southland Sharks)

References

External links
 Basketball New Zealand 2013 Results Annual
 2013 League Handbook
 2013 Pre-season Tournament Draw
 2013 Season Preview
 2013 Final Four Wrap and Season Awards

National Basketball League (New Zealand) seasons
NBL